Brenthia moriutii is a species of moth of the family Choreutidae. It was described by Yutaka Arita in 1987. It is found in Japan.

References

Brenthia
Moths described in 1987
Moths of Japan